Bald Knob is a rural locality in the Sunshine Coast Region, Queensland, Australia.

Geography 

Bald Knob has the following mountains:

Landsborough–Maleny Road passes through from south-east to west.

History 

The locality takes its name from the mountain feature Bald Knob, which was named by selector Samuel Burgess circa 1895, because the lightly forested "bald" feature stood out from the surrounding vine forest.

Bald Knob Provisional School opened on 20 January 1902. On 1 January 1909 it became Bald Knob State School. It closed in August 1945.

On Saturday 26 July 1924, a stump capping ceremony was held to celebrate the commencement of construction of the Bald Knob public hall. The hall was officially opened on 18 October 1924 by Richard Warren, the Member of the Queensland Legislative Assembly for Murrumba.

The median age of the Bald Knob population was 51 years, 14 years above the national median of 37.  77% of people living in Bald Knob were born in Australia. The other top responses for country of birth were England 6.7%, Portugal 1.6%, El Salvador 1.2%, Germany 1.2%, Canada 1.2%.  95.3% of people spoke only English at home; the next most common languages were 1.2% German, 1.2% Italian, 1.2% Spanish.

Amenities 
There are a number of parks in the area:
 Bald Knob Lookout
 Landsborough-Maleny Road Park
 MacDonalds Road Environmental Reserve
 Upper Mooloolah Nature Refuge

Attractions
Skipper Musk Teahouse Lookout is on the Landsborough Maleny Road about halfway between the mountain peaks of Bald Knob and Wilkes Knob. The name originates from a teahouse operated by Amelia Elizabeth Skipper (née Brown) and Daisy Georgina Musk (née Docwra) during the 1920s.

See also
Blackall Range road network

References

Further reading 
  – includes Bald Knob State School

Suburbs of the Sunshine Coast Region
Localities in Queensland